Lasiommata menava, the dark wall, is a species of satyrine butterfly found from Asia Minor across Transcaucasia and the mountains of Central Asia to the Hindu Kush and the north-western Himalayas.

References

Lasiommata
Butterflies described in 1865
Taxa named by Frederic Moore
Butterflies of Asia